Synaphea grandis is a shrub in the Proteaceae family, endemic to Western Australia.

It is found in the Wheatbelt region of Western Australia between Chittering and Calingiri where it grows in lateritic soils.

References

External links

Eudicots of Western Australia
grandis
Endemic flora of Western Australia
Plants described in 1995